Almas may refer to:

Places
 Almas, Tocantins, Brazil
 Almas, Ardabil, Iran
 Almas, East Azerbaijan, Iran
 Almaș, Arad County, Romania
 Almaș, Gârcina, Neamț County, Romania
 Merişor (Hungarian: Almás), Sita Buzăului, Covasna County, Romania
 Merești (colloquial Hungarian: Almás, Harghita County, Romania
 Almas, São Tomé and Príncipe
 Almaš, a former village in Bačka, Serbia
 Almash (Russian: Алмаш), Sharansky District, Bashkortostan, Russia
 Almaș River (disambiguation), the name of several rivers in Romania

People
 Almas Akram (born 1988), a female Pakistani cricketer
 Almas Atayev (born 1981), a Kazakhstani judoka
 Almas Bobby, a Pakistani transgender activist
 Almas Heshmati, a Swedish-Kurdish economist
 Almas Ildyrym (1907–1952), an Azerbaijani poet
 Almas Japua (born 1979), Abkhazian politician
 Almas Kishkenbayev (born 1985), a Kazakh singer 
 Almas Shaukat (born 1995), an Indian cricketer
 Almas Uteshov (born 1988), a Kazakhstani weightlifter

Other uses
 Almas (cryptozoology), a purported hominid cryptozoological species
 Almas caviar, the most expensive type of caviar
 Almas Hospital, in Kottakkal, Kerala, India
 Almas Temple, in Washington D.C., U.S.
 Almas Tower, in Dubai, United Arab Emirates
 Almas, a fictional currency in the video game Zeliard

See also

 Alma (disambiguation)
 Almasi (disambiguation)
 Almış, the first Muslim ruler of Volga Bulgaria
 Almas ukhaa, a genus and species of dinosaur